Statistics of the Scottish Football League in season 1902–03.

Scottish League Division One

Scottish League Division Two

See also
1902–03 in Scottish football

References

 
1902-03